Pterostylis timothyi, commonly known as the brittle snail orchid or fawn snail orchid is a species of orchid which is endemic to the south-west of Western Australia. It has a rosette of leaves at its base, and when flowering, a single green, fawn and white with erect lateral sepals.

Description
The dorsal sepal and petals are fused, forming a hood or "galea" over the column, the sepal and petals with a sharp point on the end. The sinus between the lateral sepals has a small notch in the centre a brownish central area. Flowering occurs in July and August.

Taxonomy and naming
The brittle snail orchid was first formally described in 2006 by David Jones who gave it the name Linguella timothyi. The description was published in Australian Orchid Research from a specimen collected near Jerramungup. In 2010 Jasmine Janes and Marco Duretto changed the name to Pterostylis timothyi. The specific epithet (timothyi) honours Timothy Jones, the son of the author of this species.

Distribution and habitat
The brittle snail orchid grows in woodland and heath between Hyden and Israelite Bay in the Avon Wheatbelt, Esperance Plains, Jarrah Forest and Mallee biogeographic regions.

Conservation status
This species is classified as "not threatened" by the Government of Western Australia Department of Parks and Wildlife.

References

timothyi
Endemic orchids of Australia
Orchids of Western Australia
Plants described in 2006
Taxa named by Marco Duretto
Endemic flora of Western Australia
Taxa named by David L. Jones (botanist)